Cliostomum is a genus of lichenized fungi in the family Ramalinaceae. It has about 25 species.

Species

Cliostomum aeruginascens 
Cliostomum albidum  – Falkland Islands
Cliostomum coppinsii 
Cliostomum corrugatum 
Cliostomum falklandicum  – Falkland Islands
Cliostomum flavidulum 
Cliostomum griffithii 
Cliostomum haematommatis 
Cliostomum leprosum 
Cliostomum longisporum  – Falkland Islands
Cliostomum namibicum 
Cliostomum ovocarpum 
Cliostomum piceicola 
Cliostomum praepallidum 
Cliostomum spribillei 
Cliostomum subcorrugatum 
Cliostomum subtenerum 
Cliostomum tenerum 
Cliostomum violascens

References

Ramalinaceae
Lichen genera
Taxa named by Elias Magnus Fries
Lecanorales genera
Taxa described in 1825